Sakado Station is the name of multiple train stations in Japan.

 Sakado Station (Saitama) - (坂戸駅) in Saitama Prefecture
 Sakado Station (Fukuoka) - (酒殿駅) in Fukuoka Prefecture
 Sakado Station (Ibaraki) - (坂戸駅) in Ibaraki Prefecture (closed 2007)